NGC 5917 is a  spiral galaxy located in the constellation of Libra. It was discovered by John Herschel on 16 July 1835.

See also  
 List of NGC objects (1–1000)
 Pisces (constellation)

References

External links 
 
 
 SEDS
 

Spiral galaxies
5917
054809
Discoveries by John Herschel
Libra (constellation)